Kevin R. Haslam is an American university administrator and former college football coach. He is the vice president of advancement and the executive director of the UNA Foundation at the University of North Alabama in Florence, Alabama, a position he has held since 2019. Haslam also served as the interim athletic director at North Alabama from June to August 2021.

Haslam served as the head football coach at Wayne State College in Wayne, Nebraska from 1997 to 1999 and the University of Saint Mary in Leavenworth, Kansas from 2000 to 2001. He was also the athletic director at Saint Mary during the same time period and at MacMurray College in Jacksonville, Illinois from 2005 to 2007.

Coaching career

Assistant coaching
Haslam got started in collegiate coaching as the offensive coordinator at Nebraska Wesleyan University from 1994 to 1996.

Wayne State College
Haslam's first head coaching position was at Wayne State College in Wayne, Nebraska. Haslam took over for the 1997 season and resigned after the conclusion of the 1999 season; Wayne State lost their final game, 71–30, to Northwestern Oklahoma. The Wayne State football had a record of 7–25 under his command.

University of Saint Mary
Haslam was the first head football coach for the University of Saint Mary in Leavenworth, Kansas, and he held that position for two seasons, from 2000 until he resigned 2001. The least successful football coach at the school, his record at St. Marys of 1–17 ranks him last in total wins and winning percentage. He also served as the school's athletic director during that same time period.

Eastern Arizona
Haslam resigned from Saint Mary's to become the head football coach at Eastern Arizona College in Thatcher, Arizona, a two-year college, from 2001 until the end of the 2004 season.

Athletics administration

MacMurray
Haslam took over the position of athletic director at MacMurray College after the NCAA imposed the second-ever death penalty (under new criteria) on a collegiate athletic program. MacMurray's men's tennis team was banned from outside competition for two years through the 2006–07 academic year. The team also was banned from postseason competition for the 2007–08 and 2008–09 academic years.

Arizona State
In 2007, Haslam became the Assistant Athletic Director of Annual Giving at Arizona State University where he also completes several front-office activities.

Education
Haslam earned a Bachelor of Arts degree from New Mexico Highlands University in Las Vegas, New Mexico and completed a Master of Science in education Wayne State College.

Head coaching record

College

References

Year of birth missing (living people)
Living people
Arizona State Sun Devils athletic directors
MacMurray Highlanders athletic directors
Nebraska Wesleyan Prairie Wolves football coaches
North Alabama Lions athletic directors
Saint Mary Spires athletic directors
Saint Mary Spires football coaches
Wayne State Wildcats football coaches
Junior college football coaches in the United States
New Mexico Highlands University alumni
Wayne State College alumni